Justice Hooper may refer to:

Perry O. Hooper Sr., chief justice of the Alabama Supreme Court
Robert Lettis Hooper, chief justice of the New Jersey Supreme Court